Cicimli is a village in the Lachin District of Azerbaijan.

History
The village was occupied by Armenian forces in 1992 during First Nagorno-Karabakh War. During its occupation, the village was renamed Vanotsa and was made part of Kashatagh Province of the self-proclaimed Republic of Artsakh. The village was returned to Azerbaijan on 1 December per the 2020 Nagorno-Karabakh ceasefire agreement.

Photo gallery 
The tomb of Malik Ajdar in the village

References 

Villages in Azerbaijan
Populated places in Lachin District